Wynn Irwin (December 11, 1932 – February 15, 2018) was an American film and TV actor. He was known for his roles in From Here to Eternity (1979) and Lotsa Luck (1973).

Irwin was from New York City. Irwin was in and out of performing since high school, when he was in a comedy act at Catskills resorts. Then he bought and sold a small greeting cards and gift store, then returned to performing. He served in the Army and attended New York University for a few years.

Irwin played Arthur Swann from Lotsa Luck with Dom DeLuise from 1974 to 1975. Irwin has made numerous appearances in television shows like Laverne & Shirley, The Mary Tyler Moore Show, Hart to Hart, and Barney Miller.

He co-starred with Fannie Flagg in the television film Home Cookin''' (1975)

He was reviewed for his performance in the play Marvin and Mel'' as coming off "like a ragpicker playing Lear".

Irwin had an ex-wife and a son, Andy. He died on February 15, 2018.

Filmography

Film

Television

References

External links
 
 

1932 births
2018 deaths
20th-century American male actors
21st-century American male actors
Male actors from New York City